Asaccus gardneri is a species of lizard in the family Phyllodactylidae. It is endemic to the Arabian Peninsula and occurs in the United Arab Emirates and Oman.

References

Asaccus
Reptiles of the Arabian Peninsula
Endemic fauna of Oman
Endemic fauna of the United Arab Emirates
Reptiles described in 2016